From List of National Natural Landmarks, these are the National Natural Landmarks in Guam.  There are 4 in total. All sites are on lands owned by the territorial government.

References

Guam